Nicola Moriconi (born 19 May 1982) is an Italian lightweight rower. He won a gold medal at the 2002 World Rowing Championships in Seville with the lightweight men's eight.

References

1982 births
Living people
Italian male rowers
World Rowing Championships medalists for Italy
Rowers at the 2004 Summer Olympics
Olympic rowers of Italy
Mediterranean Games bronze medalists for Italy
Mediterranean Games medalists in rowing
Competitors at the 2005 Mediterranean Games